Haruna Fadhili Niyonzima (born 5 February 1990) is a Rwandan professional footballer who plays as a midfielder for Libyan Premier League club Al Ta'awon and captains the Rwanda national team.

Club career
Born in Gisenyi, Niyonzima has played club football in Rwanda and Tanzania for Etincelles, Rayon Sports, APR, Young Africans, Simba and A.S. Kigali.

Niyonzima left A.S. Kigali at the end of 2019 to return to former club Young Africans.

International career
Niyonzima made his senior international debut for Rwanda in 2006, and has appeared in FIFA World Cup qualifying matches.

Career statistics
Scores and results list Rwanda's goal tally first, score column indicates score after each Niyonzima goal.

See also
 List of men's footballers with 100 or more international caps

References

1990 births
Living people
People from Gisenyi
Rwandan footballers
Association football midfielders
Rwanda international footballers
Rwanda A' international footballers
FIFA Century Club
Tanzanian Premier League players
Etincelles F.C. players
Rayon Sports F.C. players
APR F.C. players
Young Africans S.C. players
Simba S.C. players
AS Kigali FC players
Al Ta'awon SC players
2011 African Nations Championship players
Rwandan expatriate footballers
Rwandan expatriate sportspeople in Tanzania
Expatriate footballers in Tanzania
Rwandan expatriate sportspeople in Libya
Expatriate footballers in Libya